Anacamptis collina is a species of orchid. It is native to the Mediterranean and Caspian Sea regions, from Portugal and Morocco to Iran and Turkmenistan.

References

External links 
 
 

collina
Flora of North Africa
Flora of Southwestern Europe
Flora of Southeastern Europe
Flora of the Caucasus
Flora of Turkmenistan
Flora of Western Asia
Plants described in 1794